FC Dynamo-2 Moscow is a Russian football team from Moscow. It is the farm-club for FC Dynamo Moscow.

History
In 2016, it was revived after the parent club, Dynamo, was relegated from the Russian Football Premier League (which holds its own competition for the Under-21 teams of the Premier League clubs) and licensed to play in the third-tier Russian Professional Football League for the 2016–17 season.

Majority of the squad participated in the 2016–17 UEFA Youth League as well.

On 17 June 2017, the parent club announced that, following Dynamo's return to the Premier League, the reserves squad will now again play in the youth tournament conducted by the Premier League, and the separate professional Dynamo-2 squad is therefore dissolved.

For the 2020–21 season, the team re-entered the Russian Professional Football League once again.

The team previously played on the professional levels as FC Dynamo-d Moscow (Russian Second League in 1992–1993, Russian Third League in 1994–1997) and FC Dynamo-2 Moscow (Russian Second Division in 1998–2000). A separate team called FC Dynamo-2 Moscow (but de facto a third squad) played in the Soviet Second League in 1986–1989, Soviet Second League B in 1990–1991, Russian Second League in 1992–1993 and Russian Third League in 1994–1997.

Current squad
As of 23 September 2022, according to the Second League website.

References

External links
  Dynamo-2 page on the Dynamo's Official Website

Association football clubs established in 1986
Football clubs in Moscow
FC Dynamo Moscow
1986 establishments in Russia